was a Japanese publishing company based in Chiyoda, Tokyo. It became a subsidiary of Kadokawa Group Holdings in 2004, and merged with another Kadokawa subsidiary MediaWorks on April 1, 2008, becoming ASCII Media Works. The company published Monthly ASCII as the main publication. ASCII is best known for creating the Derby Stallion video game series, the MSX computer, and the RPG Maker line of programming software.

History

1977–1990: Founding and first projects
ASCII was founded in 1977 by Kazuhiko Nishi and Keiichiro Tsukamoto. Originally the publisher of a magazine with the same name, ASCII, talks between Bill Gates and Nishi led to the creation of Microsoft's first overseas sales office, ASCII Microsoft, in 1978. In 1980, ASCII made 1.2 billion yen of sales from licensing Microsoft BASIC. It was 40 percent of Microsoft's sales, and Nishi became Microsoft's Vice President of Sales for Far East. In 1983, ASCII and Microsoft introduced the MSX, a standardized specification for 8-bit home computers. In 1984, ASCII entered the semiconductor business, followed by a further expansion into commercial online service in 1985 under the brand of ASCII-NET. As the popularity of home video game systems soared in the 1980s, ASCII became active in the development and publishing of software and peripherals for popular consoles such as the Family Computer and Mega Drive. After Microsoft's public stock offering in 1986, Microsoft founded its own Japanese subsidiary, Microsoft Kabushiki Kaisha (MSKK), and dissolved its partnership with ASCII. At around the same time, the company was also obliged to reform itself as a result of its aggressive diversification in the first half of the 1980s. The company went public in 1989.

1989–2000: Satellites and later projects
ASCII's revenue in its fiscal year ending March 1996 was 56 billion yen, broken down by sectors: publications (52.5% or 27.0 billion yen), game entertainment (27.8% or 14.3 billion yen), systems and semiconductors (10.8% or 6 billion yen) and others. Despite its struggles to remain focused on its core businesses, the company continued to suffer from accumulated debts, until an arrangement was made That CSK Corporation would execute a major investment into ASCII in 1997.

In the mid-1990s, ASCII acquired the company Something Good, and renamed it to ASCII Something Good, through which they developed three Sega Saturn games: AI Shogi (1995), AI Igo (1997), AI Shogi 2 (1998).

ASCII originally used the name Nexoft on early American releases. In 1991, they renamed Nexoft to ASCII Entertainment, although releases around this time used the Asciiware name. To focus on supporting the interactive entertainment channel in America, startup company Agetec (for "Ascii Game Entertainment Technology") was spun off as an independent corporation in 1998 and later became a fully independent publisher one year later. Co-founder Tsukamoto had left ASCII to create a company of his own in 1992, named Impress.

2000–2008: Ownership changes and dissolution
On November 26, 2001, CSK Corporation and Unison Capital Partners L.P. announced the approval of transferring the control of its subsidiary ASCII to Unison Capital Partners L.P., effective on March 30, 2002, as part of a strategy to focus CSK's operations on B2B enterprises. The transfer was approved on December 21, 2001. As a part of deal, ASCII's outstanding debt owed to CSK was forgiven, and under Unison's control, the ASCII's Enterbrain and IT publishing divisions would maintain autonomy, while ASCII was restructured to concentrate on PC and IT publishing businesses.

On May 28, 2002, Unison Media Partners announced ASCII would become a fully owned subsidiary of via share exchange, and ASCII would be delisted, effective on October 1, 2002. On November 18, 2002, the Astroarts subsidiary was renamed to ASCII, while ASCII was renamed to MediaLeaves. The former Astroarts subsidiary would inherit the publishing business of the former ASCII. On January 29, 2004, Unison Capital Partners, L.P. announced the sale of ASCII's parent company MediaLeaves to Kadokawa Group Holdings, to be completed in March 2004.

On September 27, 2007, Kadokawa Group Holdings announced the merger between subsidiaries MediaWorks and ASCII under the name ASCII Media Works, effective on April 1, 2008. The merger was approved in 2008.
On January 10, 2010, the formerly named ASCII company MediaLeaves was merged into Enterbrain, dissolving the last of the ASCII entity.

Products

MSX

MSX is a standardized home computer architecture, announced by Microsoft and ASCII on June 16, 1983. It was conceived and marketed by Kazuhiko Nishi, then vice-president at Microsoft Japan and director at ASCII Corporation. Nishi conceived the project as an attempt to create unified standards among various home computing system manufacturers of the period. MSX systems were popular in Japan and several other countries. It is difficult to determine how many MSX computers were sold worldwide, but eventually, 5 million MSX-based units were sold in Japan alone. Despite Microsoft's involvement, few MSX-based machines were released in the United States. Before the great success of Nintendo's Family Computer, MSX was the platform for which major Japanese game studios such as Konami and Hudson Soft produced video games. The Metal Gear series, for example, was first written for MSX hardware.

See also
ASCII Media Works
List of magazines published by ASCII Media Works

Notes

References

External links
Archived ASCII Corporation page 

ASCII Media Works
Book publishing companies in Tokyo
Video game companies of Japan
Former Kadokawa Corporation subsidiaries
Magazine publishing companies of Japan
MSX
Defunct video game companies of Japan
Publishing companies established in 1977
Publishing companies disestablished in 2008
Mass media in Tokyo
Japanese companies established in 1977
Japanese companies disestablished in 2008
Video game companies established in 1977
Video game companies disestablished in 2008
Video game development companies
Video game publishers